10C or X-C may refer to:
 HP-10C series, a 1981 Hewlett-Packard calculators series
 Oflag X-C, a World War II German prisoner-of-war camp for officers located near Lübeck in northern Germany
 Route 10C (WMATA), a bus route operated by the Washington Metropolitan Area Transit Authority
 Tenth Cambridge survey, Cambridge radio survey at 15.7GHz
 Carbon-10 (10C), an isotope of carbon

See also
 C10 (disambiguation)